Richard Albert Vollenweider (June 22, 1922 in Zürich, Switzerland – January 20, 2007 in Burlington, Ontario, Canada) was a notable limnologist.

Richard Vollenweider wrote several widely cited academic works about lake eutrophication management. His pioneering work included a technical report from 1968, which related inputs of total phosphorus to chlorophyll a concentrations (a common proxy measure of algal bloom intensity).

His findings thereby laid the ground for predicting expected environmental effects on the Secchi depth and algal bloom intensity from phosphorus abatement, e.g., in sewage treatment plants.

He also played an important role in restoring several eutrophicated lakes, such as the Great Lakes of North America.

Richard Vollenweider was awarded the Tyler Environmental Prize (1986), the Naumann-Thiennemann Medal by SIL (1987), the Global 500 Roll of Honor by UNEP (1988), and the Premio Internationale Cervia for his advise on eutrophication in the Adriatic Sea (Italy). On June 2, 1989 Vollenweider received an honorary doctorate from the Faculty of Mathematics and Science at Uppsala University, Sweden

References

Boavida, M. J. L., 2007. Richard A. Vollenweider, in memoriam. Limnetica, 26(1):i-ii. 
Vollenweider, R. A., Munawar, M., Stadelmann, P., 1974. A comparative review of phytoplankton and primary production in the Laurentian Great Lakes. J Fish Res Can, 31: 739-762.

External links
Biografie Richard Vollenweider (german)

Swiss ecologists
Swiss limnologists
1922 births
2007 deaths
Swiss emigrants to Canada